Monte Shelton (1933 – June 16, 2019) was an American racing driver from Portland, Oregon.

Early life
He was born in Missouri before his family moved to Vanport, Oregon in 1943, where his father worked in a shipyard. He later joined the United States Coast Guard, serving on the USS Bluebell before going to Portland State College to work towards a degree in elementary education before he eventually became interested in automobiles.

Racing career
Shelton began racing in the early 1960s, with his career gaining traction a few years later when he began competing in the United States Road Racing Championship. Shelton also became regular competitor in Can-Am from 1966 to 1974, scoring points only in the 1974 season driving a McLaren M8F. Shelton also started several Trans-Am races between 1976 and 1987, where he took 5 race victories driving a variety of different Porsches. In sports car racing, he participated in the 24 Hours of Daytona, with a best finish of 3rd in the 1979 edition of the race with co-drivers Bruce Canepa and Rick Mears. He also participated many other IMSA Camel GT races, including the 12 Hours of Sebring. Included in his sports car career were two class victories in the Six Hours of the Glen at Watkins Glen International. Outside of sportscars, Shelton had a brief single-seater career driving in Formula 5000 cars, racing a Gurney Eagle during the 1971 SCCA L&M Continental 5000 Championship. In amateur racing, Shelton participated regularly in Portland's Rose Cup races, winning seven times over five decades. He also served as a co-founder of SCCA's Oregon Region and held a competition license with the organization for over 60 years. On October 14, 2004, he was inducted into the Oregon Sports Hall of Fame. In 2017, he was inducted into the Northwest Motorsports Hall of Fame.

Personal life
Outside of racing, Shelton owned a collector car dealership called "Monte's Motors", where he specialized in British automobiles. Shelton died June 16, 2019 from complications from pancreatic cancer.

Racing results

24 Hours of Daytona

12 Hours of Sebring

References 

1933 births
2019 deaths
Racing drivers from Portland, Oregon
24 Hours of Daytona drivers
12 Hours of Sebring drivers
Trans-Am Series drivers
Deaths from pancreatic cancer
Deaths from cancer in Oregon